Ghehi (also Romanized as Ghehī; also known as Kehi and Pāi) is a village in Emamzadeh Abdol Aziz Rural District, Jolgeh District in Isfahan County, Isfahan Province, Iran. At the 2006 census, its population was 768, in 200 families.

Historical sites, ancient artifacts and tourism

Khanabad Castle 

Khanabad Castle is a historical castle located in Qehi in Isfahan Province, The longevity of this fortress dates back to the Qajar dynasty.

Atashgah Castle, Qehi 
Atashgah Castle is a historical castle belongs to the Safavid dynasty and is located in Qehi, Isfahan Province in Iran.

References 

http://www.Ghehi.com

Populated places in Isfahan County